Prästost ("priest cheese") is a Swedish cheese with historical roots in Sweden's one-time custom of paying tithes with agricultural goods including milk. Milk spoils easily so most farms instead produced a small eyed cheese that had its curing process started by mixing in a small batch of fermented curds. This was common practice from the 16th though 19th centuries. Today, this style of cheese once produced in churches across Sweden is factory-made from pasteurized cow's milk. 

Prästost is sometimes soaked or cured in whisky or other spirits; Saaland Pfarr is one such whisky-soaked variant. A version of prästost aged for 12 months and cured in Absolut vodka has been marketed as VODCheese. 

A 1969 USDA booklet describes the manufacturing technique for one whisky-cured style of prästost:

Fresh, whole milk is set with rennet at a temperature of 90°F. When the curd is very firm, it is cut coarsely, then put in a sieve to allow the whey to drain off. The curd is collected in a cloth and kneaded to expel more whey. Whisky is mixed with the curd, then the curd is packed in a basket and salt is sprinkled on the surface. Curing is done in a cool, moist cellar. The cloth covering is changed daily for 3 days, and the cheese is washed with whisky after the third day.

References

Grainy cheeses
Swedish cheeses
Cow's-milk cheeses